Ivor Forsyth Porter CMG, OBE (12 November 1913 – 29 May 2012) was a British Ambassador and author.

Education
Porter was brought up in the Lake District and educated at Barrow-in-Furness Grammar School and Leeds University where he studied English.

Special Operations Executive
In 1939, Porter was sent to Bucharest, Romania on an academic post with the British Council to teach English at the University of Bucharest.  In 1940 he was transferred to the Legation, and remained there until it was withdrawn from Romania on 12 February 1941.

On 1 March 1941, Porter was recruited by SOE, and was one of a covert three-man mission that was parachuted into Romania in December 1943 to instigate resistance against the Nazis at "any cost" (Operation Autonomous). The SOE agents were captured and held as prisoners-of-war until, on 23 August 1944, King Michael of Romania carried out his anti-German coup d'état. Porter met King Michael that night and remained in the country during the King's desperate efforts to prevent Soviet domination. In June 2008 he was awarded the Cross of the Royal House of Romania.

Foreign Office
He joined the Foreign Office in May 1946 and served in London, Washington, D.C., the U.K. delegation to NATO, Cyprus, as U.K. representative to the Council of Europe, and India. He was ambassador in Senegal (with concurrent accreditation in Guinea, Mali, and Mauritania) and to the Arms Control Committee in Geneva.

Author
Porter wrote two books after retirement: Operation Autonomous: With SOE in Wartime Romania and Michael of Romania: The King and the Country. Operation Autonomous was short listed for the Time-Life/Pen Award for non-fiction. In 2005 he was made Commander of the Romanian order of "Meritul Cultural".

Honours

National honours
 : Companion of the Order of St Michael and St George
 : Knight Officer of the Order of the British Empire

Foreign honours
  Romanian Royal Family: 35th Knight of the Royal Decoration of the Cross of the Romanian Royal House

References

External links

1913 births
2012 deaths
Alumni of the University of Leeds
British World War II prisoners of war
World War II prisoners of war held by Romania
British Special Operations Executive personnel
People educated at Barrow-in-Furness Grammar School for Boys
Companions of the Order of St Michael and St George
Officers of the Order of the British Empire
Ambassadors of the United Kingdom to Senegal
Ambassadors of the United Kingdom to Mali
Ambassadors of the United Kingdom to Mauritania
Ambassadors of the United Kingdom to Guinea